Khalid Abdullah Al-Riyami (Arabic:خالد عبد الله الريامي) (born 17 March 1985) is an Emirati footballer. He currently plays as a defender for Dibba Al-Hisn.

External links

References

Emirati footballers
1985 births
Living people
Dibba Al-Hisn Sports Club players
Dibba FC players
UAE First Division League players
UAE Pro League players
Association football defenders